Left Democrats (in Swedish: Vänsterdemokraterna) was an attempt to form a political party in Sweden. 

The party was formed on March 28, 2004 when the local branch of the Left Party in Gnesta voted to leave the mother party. Between 2004 and 2006 the party held the two seats in the Gnesta municipal assembly.

Vänsterdemokraterna was later, at a meeting in Stockholm on January 29, 2006, constituted as a nationwide party with ambitions to contest the 2006 parliamentary elections. In the election 2006 the party gained 12 votes. In 2007 the party was reconstituted to an association and was later dissolved.

References

Swedish local political parties